Fat Camp: An MTV Docs Movie Presentation is a 2006 documentary television film about five teens at a fat camp founded by Tony Sparber, called Camp Pocono Trails (CPT), in the Poconos, Pennsylvania.

References

External links
 

2006 television films
2006 films
American documentary television films
Documentary films about obesity
Obesity in the United States
MTV Films films
2000s English-language films
2000s American films